The following is a list of Dutch artists nominated for MTV Europe Music Awards. List does not include MTV Europe Music Award for Best Dutch Act, MTV Europe Music Award for Best Dutch & Belgian Act, New Sounds of Europe or MTV Europe Music Award for Best European Act.

MTV Europe Music Awards